The Irish League in season 1898–99 comprised 6 teams, and Distillery won the championship after a play-off with Linfield.

League standings

Results

References
Northern Ireland - List of final tables (RSSSF)

1898-99
1898–99 domestic association football leagues
Lea